Amalosia obscura, also known commonly as the slim velvet gecko is a species of lizard in the family Diplodactylidae. The species is endemic to Australia.

Geographic range
A. obscura is native to the Australian state of Western Australia.

Habitat
The preferred natural habitat of A. obscura is rocky areas.

Reproduction
A. obscura is oviparous.

References

Further reading
Cogger HG (2014). Reptiles and Amphibians of Australia, Seventh Edition. Clayton, Victoria, Australia: CSIRO Publishing. xxx + 1,033 pp. .
King M (1985). "Three new species of Oedura (Reptilia: Gekkonidae) from the Mitchell Plateau of North Western Australia". Amphibia-Reptilia 5 (3–4): 329–337. (Oedura obscura, new species).
Wilson S, Swan G (2013). A Complete Guide to Reptiles of Australia, Fourth Edition. Sydney: New Holland Publishers. 522 pp. .

Amalosia
Geckos of Australia
Endemic fauna of Australia
Reptiles described in 1985